Oucques la Nouvelle (literally Oucques the New) is a commune in the department of Loir-et-Cher in central France. The municipality was established on 1 January 2017 by merger of the former communes of Oucques, Baigneaux, Beauvilliers and Sainte-Gemmes.

See also 
Communes of the Loir-et-Cher department

References 

Communes of Loir-et-Cher